The 1956–57 Tercera División season was the 21st since its establishment.

League table

Group 1

Group 2

Group 3

Group 4

Group 5

Group 6

Group 7

Group 8

Group 9

Group 10

Group 11

Group 12

Group 13

Group 14

Promotion play-off
Source:

References

External links
RSSSF 
Futbolme 

Tercera División seasons
3
Spain